LockLizard Limited is a British software company that specializes in digital rights management security for PDF documents, USB flash drives and eBooks. It was founded in 2004 by Trevor Mathews to provide Document Digital Rights Management (DRM) software that uses encoding and encryption to protect against unauthorized copying, sharing, unlimited printing or printing on virtual devices, and screen grabbing on PCs or mobile devices. Locklizard's most notable customers include NASA,  Microsoft, HP, SAP, Yamaha, BBC, Symantec, AMD, and McGraw-Hill Education.

Technology 
Locklizard implements a range of technologies accessible on PC or on the Cloud in order to achieve the features and functions necessary to protect a document. These technologies are DRM controls, document watermarking, US Government encryption, license control, and a proprietary secure PDF viewer.  Additional DRM protection includes documents locking to specific devices or locations. Locklizard does not make use of password mechanisms, digital signatures,  plug-ins,  and temporary files. It delivers license codes and keys through secure online registration procedures with user-friendly PKI class technology.

See also 
 List of PDF software

References

External links
 

British companies established in 2004
PDF software
Business software companies
Software companies of the United Kingdom
Computer companies of the United Kingdom
2004 establishments in the United Kingdom
Software companies established in 2004